Henry W. Fuller  (December 5, 1862 – December 12, 1895), was a professional baseball player who played third base in the Major Leagues for the 1891 St. Louis Browns. His brother, Shorty Fuller, also played professional baseball.

External links

1862 births
1895 deaths
Major League Baseball third basemen
Baseball players from Ohio
St. Louis Browns (AA) players
19th-century baseball players
Birmingham Ironmakers players
New Orleans Pelicans (baseball) players
Lima Lushers players
Springfield Senators players
Waco Babies players
Evansville Hoosiers players
Rockford Hustlers players
Mobile Blackbirds players
Amsterdam Carpet Tacks players
Portsmouth Truckers players